José Rodríguez (born 28 March 1959) is a former Cuban judoka who competed in the 1980 Summer Olympics.

References

1959 births
Living people
Olympic judoka of Cuba
Judoka at the 1980 Summer Olympics
Olympic silver medalists for Cuba
Olympic medalists in judo
Cuban male judoka
Medalists at the 1980 Summer Olympics
Pan American Games medalists in judo
Pan American Games gold medalists for Cuba
Pan American Games bronze medalists for Cuba
Judoka at the 1983 Pan American Games
Judoka at the 1987 Pan American Games
Medalists at the 1983 Pan American Games
Medalists at the 1987 Pan American Games
20th-century Cuban people
21st-century Cuban people